Francesca Donato (born 25 August 1969 in Ancona) is an Italian politician who was elected as a member of the European Parliament in 2019, as a member of the party Lega Nord.

European Parliament 

She was part of the group Identity and Democracy at the European Parliament.

Due to her position against the EU Digital COVID Certificate in September 2021, she was expelled both from Lega Nord and the Identity and Democracy group, and became an independent as well as the non-inscrit member of the EP.

On 2 March 2022, she voted against condemning the Russian invasion of Ukraine along with 12 other MEPs. After sharing news which were identified as fake news, her Facebook page was closed in March 2022.

Donato voted against the European Parliament resolution of 23 November 2022 on recognising the Russian Federation as a state sponsor of terrorism.

References

External links
 Home | Francesca DONATO | MEPs | European Parliament

1969 births
Living people
MEPs for Italy 2019–2024
21st-century women MEPs for Italy
Lega Nord MEPs
People from Ancona